Hanaskog Castle is a manor house at Östra Göinge Municipality in Scania, Sweden.

History
In 1827, Hanaskog was sold to Count Carl Axel Wachtmeister (1795–1865),   who owned the fideicommission Vanås. In 1852–1854, had the main building renovated and extended on two floors and turned the appearance into a manor house. Hanaskog ownership was transferred by 1891 to Baron Gerhard Louis De Geer (1854–1935),  governor of Kristianstad County and son of  countess Karolina Lovisa Wachtmeister (1826–1910) and Louis Gerhard De Geer af Finspång (1818–1896), Prime Minister of Sweden.

See also
List of castles in Sweden

References

Buildings and structures  in Skåne County